Devender Kumar Khandwal (born 10 July 1986 in Garhi, Banswara) is an Indian rower. Khandwal competed for the 2008 Summer Olympics in Beijing, where he and his partner Manjeet Singh finished last for the C-final, and eighteenth overall in the men's lightweight double sculls, with a time of 6:44.48.

References

External links

NBC 2008 Olympics profile

Indian male rowers
Living people
Olympic rowers of India
Rowers at the 2008 Summer Olympics
People from Banswara district
1986 births
Rowers at the 2010 Asian Games
Asian Games competitors for India